The following is a list of Ottoman sieges and landings from the 14th century to World War I.

Rise (1299–1453)

Growth (1453–1550)

Transformation (1550-1700)

Stagnation (1700–1827)

Decline (1828–1908)

Dissolution (1908–1922)

See also
Ottoman wars in Europe
List of cities conquered by the Ottoman Empire
List of battles involving the Ottoman Empire
List of Ottoman Empire territories
Ottoman Navy
Barbary pirates
Ottoman–Portuguese conflicts (1538–1559)

References and sources

 The Ottomans: Comprehensive and detailed online chronology of Ottoman history in English.
 Tarih Bilgi Bankası: Online history database in Turkish.
 Tarihte Bugün: Online history database in Turkish.
 E. Hamilton Currey, Sea-Wolves of the Mediterranean, London, 1910
 Bono, Salvatore: Corsari nel Mediterraneo (Corsairs in the Mediterranean), Oscar Storia Mondadori. Perugia, 1993.
 Melis, Nicola, "The importance of Hormuz for Luso-Ottoman Gulf-centred policies in the 16th century: Some observations based on contemporary sources", in R. Loureiro-D. Couto (eds.), Revisiting Hormuz – Portuguese Interactions in the Persian Gulf Region in the Early Modern Period, "Maritime Asia" 19, Fundação Calouste Gulbenkian/Harrassowitz Verlag, Wiesbaden 2008, pp. 107–120.
 Corsari nel Mediterraneo: Condottieri di ventura. Online database in Italian, based on Salvatore Bono's book.
 Turkish Navy official website: Historic heritage of the Turkish Navy (in Turkish)
 Turkish Navy official website: Turkish seamen in the Atlantic Ocean (in Turkish)
 Bradford, Ernle, The Sultan's Admiral: The life of Barbarossa, London, 1968.
 Wolf, John B., The Barbary Coast: Algeria under the Turks, New York, 1979; 

Military campaigns involving the Ottoman Empire
Invasions by the Ottoman Empire